Jasiona  is a village in the administrative district of Gmina Lubrza, within Prudnik County, Opole Voivodeship, in southern Poland, close to the Czech border.

History
The village was first mentioned in 1233, when it was part of fragmented Piast-ruled Poland. Later on, it was also part of Bohemia (Czechia), Prussia, and Germany. During World War II, the Germans operated the E591 forced labour subcamp of the Stalag VIII-B/344 prisoner-of-war camp in the village. After Germany's defeat in the war, in 1945, the village became again part of Poland.

References

Jasiona